Bamforth & Co Ltd was a publishing, film and illustration company based in Holmfirth, West Yorkshire, England.

History
Bamforth & Co Ltd was started in 1870 by James Bamforth, a portrait photographer in Holmfirth, West Yorkshire. In 1883 he began to specialise in making lantern slides. In 1898 the company started making silent monochrome films with the Riley Brothers of Bradford, West Yorkshire, who had been making films since 1896. James Bamforth's expertise with lantern slides proved invaluable in the film making. They used a camera developed by Bradford cine inventor Cecil Wray. This partnership with Riley and Bamforth, known as "RAB Films" lasted until 1900. Though film production was restarted in 1913 it was again stopped in 1915, when the film production was changed to the newly named Holmfirth Producing Company, which quickly moved operations to London. The last Holmfirth film, Meg o' the Woods, emerged in February 1918.

In 1910 Bamforth & Co Ltd started making illustrated 'saucy' seaside postcards which, like its films, were exported worldwide for sale. The company was bought out by the Dennis Printing Company, of  Scarborough during the early 1980s. Following the demise of Dennis the Bamforth & Co name, with postcards rights to over 50,000 designs, were purchased by Ian Wallace in 2001.

Although the Bamforth company was best known in the United Kingdom for producing a wide range of topographical and tourist postcards as well as 'saucy' seaside postcards, what is less well known was their rich history of filmmaking. Drawing heavily on their work with magic lantern cinema, the company began making monochrome films in 1898. The popularity of these films, in particular those featuring a character named Winky, led to a film industry in West Yorkshire which for a time surpassed that of Hollywood in terms of productivity and originality. It is also believed the company invented film editing with the release in 1899 of The Kiss in the Tunnel.

In September 2010, on the 100th anniversary of the original launch of the postcards, the new owner Ian Wallace relaunched the publication and sale of the postcards, with the Jane Evans Licensing Consultancy. Currently Mercury Print & Packaging, in Leeds has the exclusive right to reprint and distribute

Film titles

1898 – 1900

1913–1915

See also

Original Black & White film clips
 The Kiss In The Tunnel (1899) – Original film clip at Yorkshire and North East Film Archive
 Women's Rights (1899) – Original film clip at Yorkshire and North East Film Archive
 Winky Causes a Smallpox Panic (1914) – Original film clip at Yorkshire and North East Film Archive

References

External links 
Bamforth & Co Ltd Illustrators and Publishers
Remembering Bamforth & Co. Ltd
Mercury Print Leeds  - official supplier of the postcards

Companies based in Leeds
Postcard publishers
Film production companies of the United Kingdom
English printers